Gastrotheca espeletia, also known as the north shore marsupial frog is a species of frog in the family Hemiphractidae.
It is found in Colombia and Ecuador.
Its natural habitats are subtropical or tropical moist montane forests, subtropical or tropical high-altitude shrubland, subtropical or tropical high-altitude grassland, rivers, freshwater marshes, and intermittent freshwater marshes.
It is threatened by habitat loss.

References

Sources
 

Gastrotheca
Amphibians of Colombia
Amphibians of Ecuador
Amphibians of the Andes
Taxonomy articles created by Polbot
Amphibians described in 1987